The Talking Clothes : Poems (1966) is the ninth poetry collection by Australian poet William Hart-Smith. It won the Grace Leven Prize for Poetry, in 1966.

The collection consists of 86 poems, some of which had been previously published in various Australian magazines and journals, and the rest of which are published for the first time in this volume.

Contents

Critical reception
Rodney Hall in The Bulletin notes that in this collection the poet "does not seem to be addressing the solitary reader, nor haranguing the crowd. He uses a middle voice, quiet yet public, as if talking to a small groups of friends and admirers." And concludes: "These poems, with their charm and compactness, make a cogent argument against the charge that all modern verse is obscure."

In The Age, in a combined review of seven poetry collections, Dennis Douglas opines that this collection places "the poet as a mediator between the reader and the world of phenomenal objects...The incursions of phenomena are precariously held at bay in Mr. Hart-Smith's collection by the lightness of tone in his work and the use of the poet as observer."

Awards
 1966 – Grace Leven Prize for Poetry winner

See also
 1966 in Australian literature
 1966 in poetry

References

Australian poetry collections
1966 books
Angus & Robertson books